Niumi National Park is a national park in The Gambia.  The occupies the coastal strip in the northern region of the country, in the southern tip of the Sine-Saloum Delta. It covers an area of approximately 4,940 ha (49.4 square km)  and  encompasses a range of types of wetlands and vegetation, from freshwater marsh to sand spits and brackish lagoons. Rhizophora mangrove forest is abundant in the park, and its swamp and mudflats are an important sheltering ground for birds, with over 200 species found here.

Geography
Niumi National Park occupies the coastal strip in the southern tip of the Sine-Saloum Delta. The park, which lies in the North Bank Region, is approximately 4,940 ha (49.4 square km) in extent. The Gambia declared its portion of the Delta as a national park in 1986. In the north of the park, in the southern part of the delta is Jinack island and many small islands.

Fauna and flora
Regionally, the park forms part of the Western Africa Marine ecoregion. It encompasses a range of types of wetlands and vegetation, from freshwater marsh to sand spits and brackish lagoons. Rhizophora mangrove forest is abundant in the park, and scrub forest is found on Jinack Island and Mbankam spit. The Atlantic coast is heavily populated with Sterna dougallii. The swamp and mudflats are an important sheltering ground for birds, with over 200 species found here. 293 species from 63 families have been recorded of avifauna. Many species found in the park are vulnerable or endangered including the Green turtle, Humpback dolphin, Red Colobus and manatees such as Trichechus senegalensis. In the forested areas of the park, there are significant populations of Patas monkey (Erythrocebus patas), Vervet Monkey (Cercopithecus aethiops), Spotted hyena (Crocuta crocuta), and warthog (Phacochoerus africanus).

References

National parks of the Gambia
Protected areas established in 1987
Ramsar sites in the Gambia
Lower Niumi